Benjamin Daviet (born 16 June 1989) is a French male cross-country skier and biathlete. He has competed at the Winter Paralympics twice in his career in 2014 and 2018. Daviet claimed the first Paralympic gold medal of his career after winning the men's 7.5km standing biathlon event during the 2018 Winter Paralympics.

Career
Daviet made his Paralympic debut during the 2014 Winter Paralympics and claimed a bronze medal in the cross-country skiing 4 x 2.5 km relay open event.

He won the bronze medal in the men's 10km standing biathlon event at the 2021 World Para Snow Sports Championships held in Lillehammer, Norway.

References

External links 
 
 

1989 births
Biathletes at the 2014 Winter Paralympics
Biathletes at the 2018 Winter Paralympics
Cross-country skiers at the 2014 Winter Paralympics
Cross-country skiers at the 2018 Winter Paralympics
Cross-country skiers at the 2022 Winter Paralympics
French male biathletes
French male cross-country skiers
Living people
Medalists at the 2014 Winter Paralympics
Medalists at the 2018 Winter Paralympics
Medalists at the 2022 Winter Paralympics
Paralympic biathletes of France
Paralympic bronze medalists for France
Paralympic cross-country skiers of France
Paralympic gold medalists for France
Paralympic silver medalists for France
Sportspeople from Annecy
Paralympic Sport Awards — Best Male winners
Paralympic medalists in cross-country skiing
Paralympic medalists in biathlon
21st-century French people